Atibeprone is an antidepressant which was developed in the mid-1990s, but was never marketed.

References 

Antidepressants
Coumarins
Resorcinol ethers
Thiadiazoles
Abandoned drugs
Isopropyl compounds